The Carinthian-Styrian Alps (in German Steirisch-Kärntnerische Alpen or Gurk-und Lavanttaler Alpen) are a mountain range in the eastern part of the Alps. They are located in Austria.

Geography 
Administratively the range belongs to the Austrian state of Styria, Carinthia and, marginally, to Salzburg.
Its whole area is drained by the tributaries of the Danube river.

SOIUSA classification 
According to SOIUSA (International Standardized Mountain Subdivision of the Alps) the Carinthian-Styrian Alps are an Alpine section, classified in the following way:
 main part = Eastern Alps
 major sector = Central Eastern Alps
 section = Carinthian-Styrian Alps
 SOIUSA code = II/A-19

Subdivision 
The Carinthian-Styrian Alps are divided in two subsections:
 Gurktal Alps - SOIUSA code: II/A-19.I
 Lavanttal Alps - SOIUSA code: II/A-19.II

Notable summits

Some notable summits of the Carinthian-Styrian Alps are:

References

Mountain ranges of the Alps
Mountain ranges of Salzburg (state)
Mountain ranges of Styria
Mountain ranges of Carinthia (state)